Horní Poříčí is the name of several locations in the Czech Republic:

 Horní Poříčí (Blansko District), a village in the South Moravian Region
 Horní Poříčí (Strakonice District), a village in the South Bohemian Region